The 1956 Victorian Football Association season was the 75th season of the Australian rules football competition. The premiership was won by the Williamstown Football Club, after it defeated Port Melbourne in the Grand Final on 29 September by twenty-four points. It was Williamstown's eighth premiership, its third in a row (all won against Port Melbourne), and the third of five premierships won in six seasons from 1954 until 1959.

Premiership
The home-and-home season was played over twenty matches, before the top four clubs contested a finals series under the Page–McIntyre system to determine the premiers for the season.

Ladder

Finals

Awards
The leading goalkicker for the home-and-home season was Bob Bonnett (Port Melbourne), who kicked 88 goals.
The J. J. Liston Trophy was won by Jack Martin (Williamstown), who polled 41 votes. Ken Ross (Camberwell) was second with 28 votes, and Frank Johnson (Port Melbourne) was third with 25 votes.
Williamstown won the seconds premiership. Williamstown 14.16 (100) defeated Box Hill 4.7 (31) in the Grand Final, played as a curtain raiser to the firsts Grand Final on 29 September.

Notable events

Perth Carnival
The Association competed in the 1956 Perth Carnival, and finished in last place with a record of 0–4. Port Melbourne's Frank Johnson captained the Association team, and Northcote's Bill Faul served as coach. Johnson was named as captain of the All-Australian team; no other Association players were named in the team.

Other notable events
The Preston City Oval was unavailable during 1956 after being upgraded and resurfaced by the council in October 1955. Preston played its home matches at Coburg for the season.
Northcote players were paid for their services during 1956, after having played as amateurs since mid-1953 due to the club's financial difficulties. During the season, Yarraville suffered financial difficulties, and players' match payments were reduced from four pounds to ten shillings.
In its Round 1 match, Coburg 6.5 (41) trailed Preston 13.8 (86) by 45 points at three-quarter time, before kicking 8.10 to no score in the final quarter to win 14.15 (99) d. 13.8 (86).
In its Round 7 match, Yarraville defeated Williamstown by one point after Jack Whallis kicked a goal after the final siren from 35 yards.

External links
List of VFA/VFL premiers

References

Victorian Football League seasons
VFL